Ardre is a populated area, a socken (not to be confused with parish), on the Swedish island of Gotland. It comprises the same area as the administrative Ardre District, established on 1January 2016. It is most noted for the Viking Ardre image stones found under the floor boards of the Ardre Church.

Geography 
Ardre is situated on the central east coast of Gotland, with the island's oldest seaside resort Ljugarn as the main locality in the socken. The medieval Ardre Church is located in Ardre. , Ardre Church belongs to Garde parish, along with the churches in Garde, Etelhem, Alskog and Lye.

One of the asteroids in the asteroid belt, 10130 Ardre, is named after this place.

References

External links 

Objects from Ardre at the Digital Museum by Nordic Museum

Populated places in Gotland County